Polyakovka is a rural locality (a selo) and the administrative centre of Polyakovsky Selsoviet, Davlekanovsky District, Bashkortostan, Russia. The population was 384 as of 2010. There are 5 streets.

Geography 
Polyakovka is located 18 km north of Davlekanovo (the district's administrative centre) by road. Volynka is the nearest rural locality.

References 

Rural localities in Davlekanovsky District